Banke Lal Sonkar is an Indian politician and a member of the 13th Legislative Assembly of India. He represents the Shahganj constituency of Uttar Pradesh and is a member of the Bhartiya Janata Party political party.

Early life and education 
Banke Lal Sonkar was born in Jaunpur district. He is educated till BA and then completed LLB.

Political career 
Banke Lal Sonkar has been a MLA for one term. He represented the Shahganj constituency and is a member of the Bhartiya Janata Party political party. he is the Vice President in BJP SC Morcha in Uttar Pradesh.

References

Members of the Uttar Pradesh Legislative Assembly
Bharatiya Janata Party politicians from Uttar Pradesh
Living people
1957 births
People from Jaunpur, Uttar Pradesh